Christian Lange Rolfsen (6 November 1864 – 21 January 1934) was a Norwegian politician and attorney of the Conservative Party. He served as Minister of Justice from 1923 to 1924.

References 

1864 births
1934 deaths
Government ministers of Norway
Ministers of Justice of Norway